Redmond Gallagher (27 February 1914, Stranorlar – 31 October 2006, Sagra, Alicante) was an Irish businessman, nationalist and racing driver. He was chairman of Urney confectionery company and a noted motorsport enthusiast.

Family 
Gallagher was born into a prominent Irish business dynasty with origins in County Donegal. His father was Henry Thomas Gallagher, founder of Urney chocolates, one of the largest confectionery businesses in Europe, and a prominent Fianna Fáil advocate. His mother was Eileen Gallagher, a businesswomen and niece of Irish nationalist John Redmond.

Early life 
Redmond Gallagher was born on February 27, 1914, at Dunwiley House, Stranorlar, County Donegal. He was educated at Ampleforth College, Yorkshire and Belvedere College, Dublin, where he was rugby captain. He wanted to become an engineer, but at his father's request he joined the family business of Urney instead.

In 1934, Adolf Hitler became Germany's head of state with the title of Führer und Reichskanzler (leader and chancellor of the Reich). Gallagher ventured to Germany the same year and worked at factories in Dresden and Halle. At the Leipzig industrial fair, or Reichsmessestadt Leipzig (Imperial Trade Fair City Leipzig), he was introduced to Hitler, who was interested in Gallagher's nationalist background, connections and evident skill in engineering. Gallagher thought he was 'almost comical'.

References 

1914 births
2006 deaths
People from County Donegal
Irish racing drivers
20th-century Irish businesspeople
Irish expatriates in Spain
People educated at Ampleforth College
People educated at Belvedere College